Hypsopygia repetita is a species of snout moth in the genus Hypsopygia described by Arthur Gardiner Butler in 1887. It is found in Australia (Queensland), New Guinea, French Polynesia, the Society Islands, the Solomon Islands and Japan.

References

Moths described in 1887
Pyralini
Moths of Japan